Benjamin Franklin Houser (November 30, 1883 – January 15, 1952) was an American first baseman in Major League Baseball. He tied for 8th in home runs in 1912 with 8 while playing for the Boston Braves.

In 162 games over three seasons, Houser posted a .267 batting average (126-for-472) with 58 runs, 9 home runs, 75 RBI and 37 bases on balls. He finished his career with a .989 fielding percentage as a first baseman.

References

External links

1883 births
1952 deaths
Major League Baseball first basemen
Philadelphia Athletics players
Boston Braves players
Altoona Mountaineers players
Boston Rustlers players
Bowdoin Polar Bears baseball coaches
Buffalo Bisons (minor league) players
Indianapolis Indians players
Lancaster Red Roses players
Louisville Colonels (minor league) players
Rochester Bronchos players
Scranton Miners players
Toronto Maple Leafs (International League) players
People from Schuylkill County, Pennsylvania
Baseball players from Pennsylvania